The 2016–17 UMass Minutemen basketball team represented the University of Massachusetts Amherst during the 2016–17 NCAA Division I men's basketball season. The Minutemen, led by ninth-year head coach Derek Kellogg, played their home games at the William D. Mullins Memorial Center in Amherst, Massachusetts as members of the Atlantic 10 Conference. They finished the season 15–18, 4–14 A-10 play to finish in a tie for 12th place. As the No. 12 seed in the A-10 tournament, they defeated Saint Joseph's in the first round before losing to St. Bonaventure in the second round.

On March 9, 2017, the school fired head coach Derek Kellogg after nine years and a 155–137 record. Shortly after Kellogg was fired, the school announced that Winthrop head coach Pat Kelsey had been hired as the new head coach at UMass. However, shortly before the press conference to announce his hiring, Kelsey announced he would not accept the position. On March 31, the school announced they had hired Chattanooga head coach Matt McCall.

Previous season
The Minutemen finished the 2015–16 season 14–18, 6–12 in A-10 play to finish in a tie for tenth place. They defeated Rhode Island in the second round of the A-10 tournament to advance to the quarterfinals where they lost to VCU.

Offseason

Departures

2016 recruiting class

Preseason
UMass was picked to finish 10th in the Preseason A-10 poll. Donte Clark was named to the Preseason All-Conference Third Team.

Roster

Schedule and results

|-
!colspan=9 style=| Non-conference regular season

|-
!colspan=12 style=| Atlantic 10 regular season
 

|-
!colspan=9 style=| Atlantic 10 tournament

See also
 2016–17 UMass Minutewomen basketball team

References

UMass Minutemen basketball seasons
Umass